The Fernando Lara Novel Award is given annually in Spain by the José Manuel Lara Foundation and the Planeta publishing house to an unpublished novel in the Spanish language. The publication of the finalist (runner-up) work is not expected, although it is sometimes published by Planeta itself (as in the case of The Shadow of the Wind by Carlos Ruiz Zafón, finalist in 2000).

The award's endowment is €120,200. It is delivered in May of the respective year.

Winners

References

External links
 José Manuel Lara Foundation 
 Fernando Lara Novel Award at Grupo Planeta 

1996 establishments in Spain
Awards established in 1996
Spanish literary awards